Ventris may refer to:

 Ventris (crater), a lunar crater on the far side of the Moon
 William Ventris Field, 1st Baron Field (1813–1907), English judge
 Latin word for abdomen and related structures

People with the surname Ventris:

 Christopher Ventris (21st century), British tenor
 Michael Ventris (1922–1956), English architect and classical scholar
 Peyton Ventris (1645–1691), English judge and politician